G‘oliblar is an urban-type settlement in Jizzakh Region, Uzbekistan. It is the administrative center of Arnasoy District. The town population was 4,590 people in 1989, and 12,300 in 2016.

References

Populated places in Jizzakh Region
Urban-type settlements in Uzbekistan